Marinianus (c. 249268) was Roman consul in 268 AD. He has been speculated to be the cousin, son or nephew of Roman Emperor Gallienus.

Life
Gallienus appointed him together with Paternus as consul in early 268.

Marinianus, along with Valerianus Minor, were killed during the autumn of 268 in a purge of Gallienus' partisans.

Family tree

Notes

240s births
268 deaths
Year of birth uncertain
Valerian dynasty
Imperial Roman consuls
3rd-century Romans
Marinianus, Publius Egnatius
Sons of Roman emperors
Heirs apparent who never acceded